A Thet Ko A Thet Htet Po Ywae Chit The is a 2015 Burmese drama film, directed by Ko Zaw (Ar Yone Oo) starring Aung Ye Lin, Phway Phway, Thar Nyi, San Htut, Soe Myat Thuzar, Khine Hnin Wai and May Kabyar. The film, produced by Shwe Taung Film Production premiered in Myanmar on September 25, 2015.

Cast
Aung Ye Lin as Moe Myint Phyu
Phway Phway as May Thet Maung
Thar Nyi as Nyein Maung
San Htut as Tin Maung Lay
Soe Myat Thuzar as Daw Htar Shein
Wah Wah Aung as Daw Ngwe Shein
Khine Hnin Wai as Tin Tin Nwe
May Kabyar as Saw Myint Mu
Nay San as Maung Maung Latt
Ko Pauk as U Phay Thet

References

2015 films
2010s Burmese-language films
Burmese drama films
Films shot in Myanmar